Harleton is an unincorporated community in Harrison County, Texas, United States.

Education
Harleton is served by the Harleton Independent School District.

References

Unincorporated communities in Texas
Unincorporated communities in Harrison County, Texas